Thomas Greenleaf (1755–1798) was an American publisher during the 1700s who published Anti-Federalist letters including those by the Federal Farmer in the New York Journal.  He also published the laws of the state of New York.

References

Anti-Federalists
American publishers (people)